

Hermann Harrendorf (18 May 1896 – 27 March 1966) was a German general in the Wehrmacht of Nazi Germany during World War II. He was a recipient of the Knight's Cross of the Iron Cross.

Awards and decorations

 Knight's Cross of the Iron Cross on 16 February 1942 as Hauptmann and commander of III./Infanterie-Regiment 469

References

Citations

Bibliography

 

1896 births
1966 deaths
People from Altona, Hamburg
Major generals of the German Army (Wehrmacht)
German Army personnel of World War I
Recipients of the clasp to the Iron Cross, 2nd class
Recipients of the Knight's Cross of the Iron Cross
German prisoners of war in World War II
Place of birth missing
Place of death missing
Military personnel from Hamburg